National Formosa University (NFU) is a technical university in Huwei District, Yunlin County, Taiwan. It is the only university in Taiwan to include the historical name of Formosa in its title. NFU was established in Huwei Township in 1980.

National Formosa University is organized into four colleges: the College of Engineering, the College of Electronics and Information, the College of Management, and the College of Applied Arts and Sciences. They provide 19 undergraduate, 18 postgraduate, and 2 doctorate level study programs.

The Research and Services Headquarters was formed in August 2007 to manage four research centers and two multi-purpose laboratories. The aim of these bodies is to organize academic resources and provide a platform for industry-academia cooperation. The research centers focus on technical services. They are the Energy Science and Technology Center, the Micro-Electronic Mechanical System Design and Application Center, the Opto-electronic and Display Technology Center, and the Precision Mechanical Device Development Center. The two research laboratories are the Micro/Nano Science and Common Technology Laboratory and the Ultra High Precision Machining Laboratory.

Presidents

History

National Formosa University was founded in 1980 as Provincial Yunlin Institute of Technology by the Taiwan Provincial Government. Tien-Chin Chang was appointed as its first president. Five departments were established: Mechanical and Manufacturing Engineering, Mechanical and Materials Engineering, Mechanical Design, Power Mechanical Engineering, and Electrical Engineering.

In 1981, the school changed its name to National Yunlin Institute of Technology (NYIT).
 
The departments of Electro-Optical Engineering and Automation Engineering were added to NYIT in 1988.

In 1989 Cheng-Kuan Yu was appointed as the second president by the Ministry of Education.
 
In 1991, the English name of NYIT was changed to National Yunlin Polytechnic Institute (NYPI). The Department of Industrial Engineering and Management was established. Two years later, the Department of Vehicle Engineering was established. In 1994, the Department of Aeronautical Engineering started.
 
With the approbation from the Ministry of Education in 1997, NYPI was renamed to National Huwei Institute of Technology (NHIT), whose five-year junior college system was to be replaced gradually by two-year and four-year college systems.

Due to the retirement of President Cheng-Kuang Yu in 1999, Feng-Tsun Chen, Dean of Academic Affairs, served as the acting president. Chien-Chang Lin became the first elected president.
 
The Department of Information Management was established in 2000. On year later. The Department of Applied Foreign Languages began.
 
In 2002, the Department of Computer Science and Information Engineering, the Department of Finance, the Graduate Institute of Electro-Optical and Materials Science, and the Graduate Institute of Power Mechanical Engineering were established. In 2003, the Department of Business Administration and the Department of Biotechnology began.
 
In 2004, NHIT was renamed National Huwei University of Science and Technology (NHUST). Four colleges were established: Applied Arts & Science, Engineering, Electrical & Computer Engineering, and Management. The Department of Multimedia Design, the Department of Leisure Management, the Graduate Institute of Industrial Engineering and Management, and the Graduate Institute of Mechanical and Electro-Mechanical Engineering were established. A master's degree program was added to the Department of Information Management.
 
In 2005, the English name of NHUST was changed to National Formosa University (NFU). President Chien-Chang Lin retired; Yeong-Ley Tsay, dean of Academic Affairs, served as the acting president. 
The Department of Electronic Engineering was established. The master's degree and doctoral degree programs were initiated at the Department of Electrical Engineering and the Graduate Institute of Electro-Optical and Materials Science, respectively.
 
In 2006, Jenn-Der Lin assumed the presidency of NFU. The Graduate Institute of Materials Science and Green Energy Engineering and the Graduate Institute of Business and Management were established. The Department of Mechanical and Manufacturing Engineering was renamed the Department of Mechanical and Computer-Aided Engineering. The Department of General Education and the Center of Teacher Education were merged and became the Center for General Education.
 
In 2007, the Graduate Institute of Aeronautical and Electronic Engineering and the Graduate Institute of Innovation Engineering and Precision Technology were established. The Department of Leisure Management was renamed the Department of Leisure and Recreation.

In 2008, the Department of Computer Science and Information Engineering, the Department of Automation Engineering, and the Department of Biotechnology began master's degree programs.
 
The Department of Mechanical Design Engineering and the Department of Leisure and Recreation established master's degree programs in 2009. The Department of Electronic Engineering and the Department of Vehicle Engineering established master's degree programs the next year.
 
In 2011, the Department of Finance established a master's degree program. The Executive Yuan consented to NFU's procurement of a new campus. The preparatory center for the new campus was started.
 
In 2012, the Executive Yuan allocated a land of 17.18 hectares in THSR Yunlin Station area for NFU new campus.
 
In 2013, NFU received funding from the Subsidy Directions for Developing Technological University Paradigms, the Ministry of Education. Wen-Yuh Jywe was elected as the president.

Ranking

Colleges
College of  Engineering
Institute of Materials Science and Green Energy Engineering (including masters)
Institute of Mechanical and Electro Mechanical Engineering (including masters and PhD)
Dept. of Automation Engineering (including masters)
Dept. of Mechanical and Computer-Aided Engineering
Dept. of Materials Science and Engineering
Dept. of Power Mechanical Engineering
Dept. of Mechanical Design Engineering
Dept. of Aeronautical Engineering
Dept. of Vehicle Engineering
College of Electronics and Information
Institute of Electro-Optical and Materials Science (including masters and PhD)
Dept. of Electrical Engineering (including masters)
Dept. of Computer Science and Information Engineering (including masters)
Dept. of Electro-Optics Engineering
Dept. of Electronic Engineering
College of Management
Institute of Industrial Engineering and Management (including masters)
Dept. of Information Management (including masters)
Institute of Business Administration  (including masters)
Dept. of Industrial Management
Dept. of Business Management
Dept. of Finance
College of Applied Arts and Sciences
Dept. of Biotechnology (including masters)
Dept. of Leisure Planning
Dept. of Multimedia Design
Dept. of Applied Foreign Languages

Sister universities
 Japan
Kinki University 
Osaka Institute of Technology 
Meiji University 
Hiroshima International University 
Setsunan University 
Hosei University
Gunma University
Kochi University of Technology
 United States
Pittsburg State University
Southern Illinois University Carbondale 
Silicon Valley University 
University of California, Davis
 Canada
Rotman School of Management, University of Toronto
 China
Wuhan University of Science and Technology
 United Kingdom
Napier University
 Italy
The University of Calabria
 Sri Lanka
University of Peradeniya

Notable alumni
 Chang Li-shan, Magistrate of Yunlin County

See also
 List of universities in Taiwan

References

External links

Formosa University official website
National Formosa Library website
National Formosa University map
Bird's eye view of NFU (flash)

 
Educational institutions established in 1980
1980 establishments in Taiwan
Universities and colleges in Taiwan
Technical universities and colleges in Taiwan